The 2002 Giro d'Italia was the 85th edition of the Giro d'Italia, one of cycling's Grand Tours. The Giro began in Groningen, the Netherlands, with a Prologue individual time trial on 11 May, and Stage 11 occurred on 23 May with a stage from Benevento. The race finished in Milan on 2 June.

Stage 11
23 May 2002 — Benevento to Campitello Matese,

Stage 12
24 May 2002 — Campobasso to Chieti,

Stage 13
25 May 2002 — Chieti to San Giacomo di Valle Castellana,

Stage 14
26 May 2002 — Numana to Numana,  (ITT)

Rest day
27 May 2002

Stage 15
28 May 2002 — Terme Euganee to Conegliano,

Stage 16
29 May 2002 — Conegliano to Corvara,

Stage 17
30 May 2002 — Corvara to Folgaria,

Stage 18
31 May 2002 — Rovereto to Brescia,

Stage 19
1 June 2002 — Cambiago to Monticello Brianza,  (ITT)

Stage 20
2 June 2002 — Cantù to Milan,

References

2002 Giro d'Italia
Giro d'Italia stages